Wilson v St Helens Borough Council [1999] 2 AC 52 is a UK labour law case concerning transfers of undertakings, and the job security rights of employees.

Facts
Mr Wilson was a teacher whose school had been transferred to St Helens BC. He was dismissed for being ‘redundant’. Then he and other teachers were rehired on new contracts with worse terms. They continued working for a few months before claiming that the reduced wages were in breach of r 5 (now TUPER 2006 r 4). Were the dismissals effective? If not, teachers could claim to be employees under the old terms, whereas if so, they could merely claim unfair dismissal. They wanted to claim unauthorised deductions from pay.

Judgment
Lord Slynn held that the dismissals were effective. Employees’ rights are to be safeguarded, and that means the rights which employees have. Those rights are determined by national law, and there is no general rule of specific performance. Therefore, the dismissals were effective.

So because there is no English law concept of a dismissal being a nullity, the dismissed employees merely got a right to compensation.

See also

UK labour law

Notes

References

United Kingdom labour case law
House of Lords cases
1999 in case law
1999 in British law